Aleksandra Wnuczek (born 23 May 1986) is a road cyclist from Poland. She represented her nation at the 2007 UCI Road World Championships.

References

External links
 profile at Procyclingstats.com

1986 births
Polish female cyclists
Living people
Place of birth missing (living people)
21st-century Polish women